Morten Ansgar Kveim (27 December 1892 – 24 March 1966) was a Norwegian pathologist most remembered for describing the Kveim test.

Kveim was born at Gjerstad  in Aust-Agder, Norway. First starting in philology, he completed his medical training at the University of Oslo (1924).He qualified in medicine in 1925, and worked in private practice at a number of small towns in Norway. After 1929 he worked in the department of diseases of the skin in the Rikshospitalet in Oslo, becoming assistant physician in 1936.

References

External links 

1892 births
1966 deaths
People from Aust-Agder
University of Oslo alumni
Norwegian pathologists
Oslo University Hospital people